Greece has participated in the biennial classical music competition Eurovision Young Musicians eleven times since its debut in 1990, winning the contest for the first time in 2008.

Participation overview

See also
Greece in the Eurovision Song Contest
Greece in the Eurovision Dance Contest
Greece in the Junior Eurovision Song Contest

References

External links
 Eurovision Young Musicians

Countries in the Eurovision Young Musicians